Board games were included as events during the 2006, 2010 and 2018 Asian Games. These games included chess, go, xiangqi, and contract bridge.

Events

Bridge

Chess

Go

Xiangqi

Medal table

Participating nations

Bridge

Chess

Go

Xiangqi

List of medalists

References

External links
 Ocasia

 
Asian Games
Go competitions in Asia
Sports at the Asian Games
Asian Games